Pressombudsmannen (or press Ombudsman) is a person whose role in the Swedish print media is to determine whether the actions of a newspaper is in line with good journalistic practice. Complaints regarding the practices of print media can be reported by the general public to the Pressombudsmannen who determines whether a complaint should be brought before the Swedish Press Council (SPC). The SPC can issue fines of up to SEK 2,000 and publish a rejecting opinion.

The charter of the PON, the standing instructions of the Press Ombudsman, and funding for both is the responsibility of the Press's Cooperation Committee.

References 

 

Mass media in Sweden
Organizations established in 1969
Mass media complaints authorities
Consumer organizations in Sweden
 Pressombudsmannen
Ombudsman organizations
Regulation in Sweden